Guy Nicholas Flanagan (born 1980) is an English actor, best known for portraying John Mitchell in the pilot episode of Being Human.

Background
Born in New Longton, Lancashire, Flanagan attended Cardinal Newman College, and went on to train at Drama Centre London. Flanagans mother Poppy Flanagan is also an actress, she previously worked as a teacher.

Career
After graduating from drama school, Flanagan joined the Royal Shakespeare Company, playing Oswald in the RSC Academy production of King Lear. His other theatre work includes Cymbeline and Mimi and the Stalker.

Flanagan has appeared in the films Millions (2004), Stoned (2005) and A Bunch of Amateurs (2008).

Flanagan played the lead role of John Mitchell in the pilot episode of Being Human; the character was played by Aidan Turner in the subsequently produced series. His other television credits include Messiah: The Harrowing, Holby City, Totally Frank, Doctors and The Bill.

Filmography

Television

Film

Theatre

References

External links

Actors from Preston, Lancashire
Alumni of the Drama Centre London
English male television actors
English male film actors
English male stage actors
Living people
1980 births